Suibne mac Colmáin (died 600) was a King of Uisnech in Mide of the Clann Cholmáin. He was the son of Colmán Már mac Diarmato (died 555/558), also King of Uisnech. He ruled Uisnech from 587 to 600.

The Marianus Scotus king list names Suibne mac Colmáin as High King of Ireland. He may also be the Suibne referred to in the Baile Chuind (The Ecstasy of Conn) The annals and other king lists do not give him this title, however. He was slain in 600 at Brí Dam on the Suaine (near modern Geashill, County Offaly) by his uncle, the high king  Áed Sláine mac Diarmato (died 604) of the Síl nÁedo Sláine, treacherously according to the Life of St. Columba by Adomnán.

Suibne's sons Conall Guthbinn mac Suibni (died 635) and Máel Dóid mac Suibni (died 653) were also kings of Uisnech. His daughter Uasal ingen Suibni (died 643) married Fáelán mac Colmáin (died 666?), King of Leinster from the Uí Dúnlainge.

Notes

See also
Kings of Uisnech

References

 Annals of Tigernach at CELT: Corpus of Electronic Texts at University College Cork
 Annals of Ulster at *CELT: Corpus of Electronic Texts at University College Cork
 Charles-Edwards, T. M. (2000), Early Christian Ireland, Cambridge: Cambridge University Press, 
 Byrne, Francis John (2001), Irish Kings and High-Kings, Dublin: Four Courts Press, 
 Mac Niocaill, Gearoid (1972), Ireland before the Vikings, Dublin: Gill and Macmillan
 Book of Leinster,Rig Uisnig at CELT: Corpus of Electronic Texts at University College Cork
 Laud Synchronisms at CELT: Corpus of Electronic Texts at University College Cork

 Hogan, SJ, Edmund (1910), Onomasticon Goedelicum, Documents of Ireland, University College Cork, Cork, Ireland

External links
CELT: Corpus of Electronic Texts at University College Cork

Kings of Uisnech
600 deaths
6th-century Irish monarchs
Year of birth unknown